Nechi is a town and municipality in the Colombian department of Antioquia.

Climate
Nechí has a tropical rainforest climate (Af) with heavy to very heavy rainfall year-round.

References

Municipalities of Antioquia Department